Fedir Manailo (1910–1978) was a Ukrainian artist from Zakarpattia Oblast, influenced by the expressionist movement. The territory of today's Zakarpattia Oblast at that time part of Austria-Hungary, later part of Czechoslovakia and Hungary until 1945.

Manailo studied at the Art and Technical School in Prague with Brunner.  He visited France in 1930, traveling to Paris, Marseilles and Lyon, France.  From 1937 to 1945 he taught decorative art at the Uzhhorod Trade School, before moving on to lecture at the Uzhhorod Art School.  Starting from the 1940s, Manailo painted genre scenes of the Zakarpattia.

References

20th-century Ukrainian painters
20th-century Ukrainian male artists
1910 births
1978 deaths
Expressionist painters
Ukrainian male painters
Soviet painters
Czechoslovak artists